Edmund Chen (born 4 February 1961) is a Singaporean former actor and artist. He began his career in 1987 and rose to become one of Singapore's most prominent and popular actors during the 1990s and early 2000s.

Career
Chen entered the entertainment industry after completing the SBC (predecessor of MediaCorp) 7th drama training course in 1987. He starred in several high-profile dramas such as sci-fi drama series Star Maiden, Air Force and police thriller Patrol, where he met and later married co-star Xiang Yun. During the late 1990s he temporarily left showbiz for several years to concentrate on other projects. After returning to MediaCorp his popularity soared and he won the Top 10 Most Popular Male Artistes award seven consecutive times. During the Star Awards 2007 25th anniversary special, he and Ivy Lee, who played his on-screen partner many times, were named the Top 5 Favourite On-screen Couples for their roles as husband and wife in Double Happiness. He left MediaCorp at the end of 2007 for family reasons but made a brief return to the screens as a guest star in Channel 5 comedy Calefare and the second season of Channel U production Perfect Cut. Besides acting, he has also presented and hosted shows ranging from sports events to variety shows to charity galas.

In 2003, Chen acted in a Hong Kong film, Turn Left, Turn Right as Dr Hu, and in 2008, acted as the father of Chun-Li in Street Fighter: The Legend of Chun-Li.

Chen directed his first feature film Echoing Love (爱情六重奏), which consists of six shorts directed by six different people and the cast includes Erica Lee, Alaric Tay, Vincent Ng, Nathaniel Ho and his wife Xiang Yun. It was screened at the 24th Singapore International Film Festival in 2011, where it won a Special Achievement Award at the Silver Screen Awards.

Other work
Chen left the entertainment industry in 2007 and he began writing and illustrating Chinese language children's books. Two of his titles Dino Rulez! (欢迎来到我们的世界) and Little Otters To The Rescue! (水獭宝宝救爸爸) have been selected by the National Arts Council for its yearly catalogue.

Endorsements
Chen functions as a brand ambassador and spokesman for many firms and products, including Beijing 101 Hair Consultants (www.beijing101hair.com), Mitsubishi Electric, Chien Chi Tow, G- Spa, Donut Empire and KKC Property in Singapore and throughout the Asian region.

Personal life
Chen is the eldest of three children. His younger brother Eric manages an events management company, while his younger sister is the theatre director and entrepreneur Loretta Chen.

Chen married fellow MediaCorp actress Xiang Yun in 1989 after meeting on the sets of Patrol and they have two children; a daughter Yixin and a son Yixi.

Filmography

Films

TV series

Awards and nominations

Asian Television Awards

Star Awards – Acting/Popularity Awards

References

External links

Bio on MediaCorp website

Singaporean male actors
Male actors of Chinese descent
Living people
Catholic High School, Singapore alumni
Singaporean people of Hokkien descent
1961 births